Hangman's Knot is a 1952 American Western film written and directed by Roy Huggins and starring Randolph Scott. The film is about a group of Confederate soldiers, unaware that the Civil War is over, who intercept a shipment of gold escorted by Union cavalry troops and are then pursued by a renegade posse. Hangman's Knot was filmed on location in the Alabama Hills in Lone Pine, California.

Plot
In the spring of 1865 in Nevada, a small band of Confederate soldiers disguised as civilians intercept a shipment of gold escorted by Union cavalry troops. Following a heated battle that kills all the Union soldiers, Confederate Major Matt Stewart learns from the dying Union officer that the war ended a month earlier. Matt and his men transport the gold as planned to the scheduled rendezvous with Captain Petersen, who has been scouting the area disguised as a traveling peddler. When Petersen confirms that he knew the war was over but made no attempt to tell the men, hot-headed Rolph Bainter shoots him dead, in anger over the unnecessary deaths of their own men during the ambush. The men briefly debate what to do with the gold. As ranking officer, Matt decides they will take the gold back to the South to help finance their country's reconstruction.

The following day, Matt disguises himself and uses Petersen's covered wagon to transport the gold and his men out of the area. Soon they are stopped by a group of drifters posing as a posse looking for the gold thieves. Matt persuades the posse's leader Quincey that they've been caught elsewhere. Matt and his men continue on, but the mules bolt from the wagon and the rebels are forced to commandeer a stagecoach carrying a former Union war nurse, Molly Hull, and her companion Lee Kemper. Quincey's posse chases the stage to a station house, capturing one of Matt's men, Cass Browne, who they take with them. Matt and his men take the stage passengers, the aging station agent Plunkett, and his daughter Margaret Harris hostage.

Mrs. Harris hates the Confederates for her husband was killed at the Battle of Gettysburg and her only son was one of the Nevada Volunteers who the Confederates had wiped out. One of the Confederates, Egon, responds that Jaime watched his parents murdered during Sherman's March to the Sea.

Quincey's posse surrounds the station house, and Matt tells them the gold was left out on the trail, but they are reluctant to go back unless they are sure of it. As night descends, the posse tries to lure the Confederates out by threatening to hang Cass, but Matt is able to rescue him using the remaining sticks of dynamite from their ambush.

The following day, Kemper offers Matt a plan of escape in exchange for two gold bars. Giving Matt an Indian token, Kemper explains that his good trading relationship with the local Paiute Indians and this token will guarantee fresh horses and safe passage out of the territory. He also knows by the approaching clouds that a brief torrential rainstorm will soon arrive and supply Matt and his men cover for their escape. Matt agrees to the plan. Later, while Molly in another room, is caring for the seriously wounded Egon, Rolph tries to rape her. An enraged Matt stops him and beats him in a fistfight. When an angry Rolph tries to shoot Matt, young Jamie Groves shoots him dead, and Molly shows her feelings for Matt.

During the night, Quincey and his men have been digging a short tunnel under the station house. Just when they break through and reach a trap door in the floor, Cass stops them from entering. Frustrated, Quincey decides to burn the station house down and orders his men to torch the roof. As the fire burns through the roof, Kemper's predicted thunderstorm arrives. In the confusion, Kemper tries to escape with his two gold bars and is shot dead by the posse. When Cass sneaks outside to scatter the posse's horses, he is also killed. As Matt and Jamie prepare to escape, Molly begs Matt not to take the gold. Outside in the chaos of the storm, Quincey and his men begin shooting at one another. Believing Matt told the truth about the whereabouts of the gold, the surviving members of the posse race each other into the night.

With the posse gone, and respecting Molly's wishes, Matt and Jamie surrender the gold to Plunkett. Margaret and Plunkett offer a home to young Jamie, who promises he will return. Matt also promises Molly that he will return to her after he is repatriated in Virginia, and the two embrace.

Cast
 Randolph Scott as Major Matt Stewart
 Donna Reed as Molly Hull
 Claude Jarman, Jr. as Jamie Groves
 Frank Faylen as Cass Browne
 Richard Denning as Lee Kemper
 Lee Marvin as Rolph Bainter
 Glenn Langan as Captain Petersen
 Jeanette Nolan as Mrs. Margaret Harris
 Clem Bevans as Plunkett, the Station agent
 Ray Teal as Quincey
 Guinn Williams as Smitty
 Monte Blue as Maxwell
 John Call as Egan Walsh

Production

Filming locations
 Alabama Hills, Lone Pine, California, USA 
 Corriganville Movie Ranch, Simi Valley, California, USA

Reception
In his review in The New York Times, A. W. wrote that the Western genre film is "given handsome, credible and edifying treatment" by writer-director Roy Huggins in Hangman's Knot, calling the film a "taut, action-filled adventure".

In her review in Allmovie, Tana Hobart called the film a "well done, tense western with a good, dry sense of humor." In his review in DVD Verdict, Judge Paul Corupe called the film "a pretty fair Technicolor b-western bookended with some exciting action sequences." 
In his review for Reel Film Reviews, David Nusair wrote that Hangman's Knot is "surprisingly fast-paced for a film of this sort, and though there's an almost incoherent rain-soaked battle towards the end, the film essentially remains entertaining throughout." Nusair also notes the "real chemistry" between Scott and Reed.

See also
 List of American films of 1952

References

External links

 
 
 
 

1952 films
1952 Western (genre) films
American Western (genre) films
Columbia Pictures films
Films set in 1865
Films set in Nevada
Films shot in Lone Pine, California
Revisionist Western (genre) films
1950s English-language films
1950s American films